May is a surname of Germanic (Saxon) and, independently, of Gaelic origin.  There are many variants used in English-speaking countries, as well as several variants used in Germany. The Scottish May is a sept of Clan Donald.  The surname "May" remains a common surname in the United States, England, Scotland, Ireland, Canada, Germany, Australia and New Zealand, as well as among Russians of German origin; possibly also persisting in areas of the Netherlands and France.

People with the surname May include:

Abby May (1800–1877), American social activist
Alan Nunn May (1911–2003), English spy
Alfred May (engineer) (1851–1920), engineer and inventor in South Australia
Andrew J. May (1875–1959), American politician
Arthur Johan May (1903–1979), acting Prime Minister of Suriname
Bailey May (Born 2002), Filipino singer,  dancer and actor. Member of the new global pop group formed by Simon Fuller, Now United
Barry May (born 1944), South African-born former English cricketer
Billy May (1916–2004), American arranger
Bob May, see Robert May
Bob May (golfer) (born 1968), American golfer
Brad May (born 1971), Canadian ice hockey player
Brian May (born 1947), English rock guitarist and astrophysicist
Brian May (Australian composer) (1934–1997), Australian bandleader
Buckshot May (1899–1984), American baseball player
Butler May (1894–1917), known as "Stringbeans", American blues and vaudeville performer
Carlos May (born 1948), American baseball player
Charles S. May (1830–1891), American politician from Michigan
Christine May (born 1948), Irish politician
Christof May (1973–2022)
Clifford May (born 1951), American activist
Corinna May (born 1970), German singer
Corrinne May (Corrinne Foo May Ying, born 1973), Singaporean singer-songwriter
Cyril May (born 1929), Australian singer-songwriter
Dan May (1898–1982), Nashville civic leader
Daniel Boone May (1852–1878), American gunfighter
Darrell May (born 1972), American baseball player
Dave May (1943–2012), American baseball player
David May (disambiguation)
Deborah May, American actress 
Dent May (born 1985), American pop musician
Derrick May (baseball player) (born 1968)
Derrick May (musician) (born 1963), American electronic pop music composer
Donald May (1929–2022), American actor
Doris May (1902–1984), American film actress
Dustin May (born 1997), American baseball player
Eddie May (1943–2012), English footballer and manager
Edith May (pseudonym of Anne Drinker; 1827–1903), American poet
Edmund May (1876–1956), German architect
Edna May (1878–1948), American singer and actress
Eduard May (1905–1956), German biologist, natural philosopher
Ela Q. May, child actress of the Edwardian era
Elaine May (born 1932), American screenwriter and director
Elizabeth May (born 1954), Canadian politician
Elizabeth May (athlete) (born 1983), Luxembourgian triathlete
Emil May (1850–1933), German engineer
Ernst May (1886–1970), German architect
Erskine May, 1st Baron Farnborough (1815–1886), English constitutional lawyer
Eva May (1902–1924), Austrian actress
Fiona May (born 1969), British and Italian athlete and actress
Francis Henry May (1860–1922), Hong Kong Governor
Frederick May (composer) (1911–1985), Irish composer
Frederick May (engineer) (John Frederick May, 1840–1897), Australian engineer and inventor
George May, 1st Baron May (1871–1946), British financial expert and public servant
George S. May (1890–1962), American business and pre-eminent golf promoter
Gisela May (1924–2016), German actress
Graham May (died 2006), New Zealand weightlifter
Guillermo May (born 1998), Uruguayan football player
Gustave May (1881–1943), American photographer
Hans May (1886–1958), Austrian film music composer
Henry May (disambiguation)
Hugh May (1621–1684), English architect
Imelda May (born 1974), Irish singer
Irma May (1899-?), Polish social reformer
Jack May (1922–1997), English actor
James May (born 1963), English motor journalist and TV presenter
Jan May (born 1995), German cyclist
Jesse May (born 1980), American poker player
Jodhi May (born 1975), English actress
Joe May (disambiguation)
Joe May (1880–1954), Austrian film director
Johann Friedrich May (1697–1762), German political scientist
John May (disambiguation)
Jon May (born 1939), American mathematician
Jonathan May (1958–2010), American cellist and conductor
Joseph May (born 1974), English actor
Julia Harris May (1833–1912), American poet, teacher, school founder
Julian May (1931–2017), American science fiction author
Julie von May (1808–1875), Swiss feminist
Juliet May (born 1966), English film director
Juliet May (judge) (born 1961), English judge
Jürgen May (born 1942), German athlete
Karl May (1842–1912), German writer
Karl Ivanovich May (1820–1895), Russian educator
Kathy May (born 1956), American tennis player
Kenneth May (1915–1977), American mathematician
Lady May, American rapper
Larry May (born 1958), English footballer
Lee May (1943–2017), American baseball player
London May (born 1967), American rock musician
Mac May (born 1999), American volleyball player
Margaret May (born 1950), Australian politician
Márcio May (born 1972), Brazilian cyclist
Marin May (born 1977), American actress
Marc May (born 1956), American football player
Mark May (born 1959), American football player
Mathilda May (born 1965), French actress
Mia May (1884–1980), Austrian actress
Michaela May (born 1952), German actress
Michael May (racing driver) (born 1934), Swiss racing driver
Michael May (cricketer) (born 1971), English cricketer
Mick May (born 1976 Coventry), Rugby player  
Mike May (Iowa politician) (born 1945), American politician (Iowa)
Mike May (skier) (born 1954), winter Paralympics athlete
Milt May (born 1950), American baseball player
Patricia May, Chilean anthropologist
Percy May (1884–1965), English cricketer
Peter May (cricketer) (1929–1994), English cricketer
Peter May (writer) (born 1951), Scottish writer
Phil May (caricaturist) (1864–1903), English illustrator
Phil May (singer) (1944–2020), English rock singer and lyricist
Philip May (born 1957), husband of Theresa May
Ralphie May (1972–2017), American comedian
Richard May (disambiguation)
Rick May (1940–2020), American (voice) actor, theatrical performer, director, and teacher
Robert May (disambiguation)
Rollo May (1909–1994), American psychologist
Rüdiger May (born 1974), German boxer
Rudy May (born 1944), American baseball player
Sarah May (born 1972), English writer
Scott May (born 1954), American basketball player
Sean May (born 1984), American basketball player
Simon May (born 1944), English film and TV music composer
Søren Nielsen May (died 1679), Danish priest
Theresa May (born 1956), British former Prime Minister
Tim May (born 1962), Australian cricketer
Timothy C. May, (1951–2018) American engineer and writer
Tina May (1961–2022), English jazz singer
Thomas May (1594/5–1650), English poet
Tom May (rugby union) (born 1979), English rugby player
Torsten May (born 1969), German boxer
Trevor May (born 1989), American baseball player
Vladimir May-Mayevsky (1867–1920), Russian general
William May (theologian) (died 1560), English archbishop
Wop May (1896–1952), Canadian pilot
Zakhar May (born 1969), Russian rock musician

See also
Maye (disambiguation)
Mays (disambiguation)
Mayne (disambiguation)
Mayhew (disambiguation)
Maybery
Maynard (disambiguation)
Mayall (disambiguation)
Mey (disambiguation)
Meynell

Notes

German-language surnames
Germanic-language surnames
Gaelic-language surnames
English-language surnames
Burmese-language surnames
Surnames of Burmese origin